Sir Frank Lockwood, QC (15 July 1846 – 18 December 1897) was an English lawyer and Liberal Party politician who sat in the House of Commons as MP for City of York from 1885 to 1897.

Life
Lockwood was born in Doncaster, the son of Charles Day Lockwood. His great-grandfather Joseph Lockwood (c. 1758-1837) was twice mayor of Doncaster, and his grandfather was for many years judge on the racecourse. Lockwood was educated at a private school, at Manchester Grammar School, and Caius College, Cambridge.

Lockwood was called to the bar at Lincoln's Inn in 1872, and joined the old midland circuit, afterwards going to the north-eastern, making in his first year 120 guineas and in the next 265 guineas. From that time he had a career of uninterrupted success, a high-profile brief being the defence of the murderer Charles Peace in 1879. In 1880 was a member of a Royal Commission to enquire into Corrupt Practices at Chester. He was made a Queen's Counsel in 1882 and in 1884 he was made recorder of Sheffield.

Lockwood made two unsuccessful attempts to enter parliament, the one at King's Lynn at the 1880 general election, the other at York at by-election in 1883. He was elected Liberal Member of Parliament (MP) for York at the 1885 general election and held the seat until his death in 1897. In 1894 he became solicitor-general in Lord Rosebery's ministry, and was knighted.  He was solicitor-general for less than a year. During this period he prosecuted the murderer James Cadham Read.

In May 1895 Lockwood was lead counsel for the prosecution in Regina v. Oscar Wilde. The Liberal government seemed determined to get a successful prosecution.  Edward Carson, who had successfully defended the Marquess of Queensbury against Wilde's misguided criminal libel, approached Frank Lockwood and asked "Can we not let up on the fellow now?". Lockwood answered that he would like to do so, but feared that the case had become too politicised to be dropped.

In 1896 Lockwood accompanied Lord Chief Justice Russell and barrister Montague Hughes Crackanthorpe to the United States to attend the nineteenth meeting of the American Bar Association as specially invited representatives of the English bar. On the trip he sustained the reputation which he enjoyed in England as a humorous after-dinner speaker, and helped to strengthen the bond of friendship between the bench and bar of the United States and the bench and bar of England.

Lockwood's uncle Henry Francis Lockwood was an architect and his father a talented draughtsman. Lockwood also had a skill at drawing, which he used to amuse himself and his friends, by making caricatures in pen and ink, and  sketches of humorous incidents, real or imaginary, relating to the topic nearest at hand. He illustrated C. J. Darling's Scintillae Juris in 1889 and contributed to Punch from 1893 to 1897. An exhibition of his work was held in London in March 1889. He was also author of The Law and Lawyers of Pickwick published in 1894.

Lockwood lived at Cober Hill, Cloughton, near Scarborough, North Yorkshire. He died in London at the age of 51.

Lockwood married Julia Rosetta Salis Schwabe, daughter of Salis and Julia Schwabe of Manchester and Glyn-y-Garth, Anglesey, on 3 September 1874. His wife was the sister of fellow MP George Salis-Schwabe and the daughter of the educationalist Julia Schwabe.

Lockwood was the brother-in-law of the 21st MacLean of Lochbuie and there is a small island off the coast of Mull in Scotland near Lochbuie named after him.

References
See Augustine Birrell's biography of Lockwood and The Frank Lockwood Sketch-Book (1898).
Entry in Oxford Dictionary of National Biography by Augustine Birrell revised by H C G Matthew, OUP 2004-8
 Baird, Bob (1995) Shipwrecks of the West of Scotland. Glasgow. Nekton Books.

Notes

External links 
 
 
 

1846 births
1897 deaths
Liberal Party (UK) MPs for English constituencies
UK MPs 1885–1886
UK MPs 1886–1892
UK MPs 1892–1895
UK MPs 1895–1900
Solicitors General for England and Wales
Members of Lincoln's Inn
People educated at Manchester Grammar School
Alumni of Gonville and Caius College, Cambridge
Knights Bachelor
19th-century King's Counsel
People from Doncaster